Kirkuk may refer to:
 Kirkuk Governorate - a region within Iraq
 Kirkuk District - a district within Kirkuk Governorate 
 Kirkuk - a city within Kirkuk District
 Kirkuk Air Base - an air base controlled by the Iraqi Air Force
 Kirkuk–Ceyhan Oil Pipeline - an oil pipeline running from Iraq to Turkey
 Kirkuk FC - an association football club